Sara Zarr (born October 3, 1970) is an American writer. She was raised in San Francisco, and now lives in Salt Lake City, Utah with her husband. Her first novel, Story of a Girl, was a 2007 National Book Award finalist. She has subsequently had six novels published.

Biography and career
Born in Cleveland, Ohio and raised in San Francisco, she earned a degree in communications from San Francisco State University. Zarr grew up as part of a Jesus Movement church and still identifies as a Christian. Her first three manuscripts were never published, but after winning the Utah Arts Council prize for best unpublished young adult novel of 2003, she was able to find an agent who successfully sold Story of a Girl as the first of a two-book deal, to Little, Brown Books for Young Readers.

Inspired by the kidnapping of Elizabeth Smart and Zarr's Christian roots, her third book, Once Was Lost (also published as What We Lost) addresses issues of faith, identity and home. The original title comes from the hymn Amazing Grace written by John Newton. While the characters are Christian, the book was published for a mainstream audience and neither promotes nor criticizes organized religion.

In 2008, Zarr contributed to the young adult for Obama project started by fellow YA author Maureen Johnson. Zarr's articles included "Red State Jesus Freaks for Obama" and "Personal Sacrifice."

Zarr has been a regular contributor to Image Journal's Good Letters blog.

In 2010, she served as a judge for the National Book Awards.

From 2013-2015, Zarr taught at Lesley University’s Low-Residency Master of Fine Arts in Creative Writing program.

From 2012-2015; 2020-present Zarr hosted and produced the podcast This Creative Life. It featured Zarr in conversation with other writers. She has self-published a companion book to the podcast.

With her 2017 novel, Gem & Dixie (loosely based on some of her early life experiences), Zarr moved to the HarperCollins imprint Balzer + Bray, and has another book slated with them for 2018.

Story of a Girl was adapted into a television movie that will air on Lifetime starting in July 2017. It marks Kyra Sedgwick's directorial debut and features Sedgewick's husband, Kevin Bacon.

Bibliography

Standalone novels
2007 — Story of a Girl
2008 — Sweethearts
2009 — Once Was Lost (Republished as What We Lost in 2013, then reverted to original title)
2011 — How to Save a Life
2013 — The Lucy Variations 
2013 — Roomies co-written with Tara Altebrando
2017 — Gem & Dixie
2020 — Goodbye from Nowhere
2020 — Courageous Creativity: Advice and Encouragement for the Creative Life
2022 — A Song Called Home

Zarr has also read the audio versions of four of her books.

Short fiction
"This Is My Audition Monologue" appears in Geektastic: Stories from the Nerd Herd, edited by Holly Black and Cecil Castellucci, 2009
"Train" appears in the Spring 2016 issue of Relief: A Journal of Art and Faith

Essays
"It Is Good" appears in Does This Book Make Me Look Fat?, edited by Marissa Walsh, 2008
"Who Is My Mother, Who Are My Brothers?" first appeared in Image, and appears in Jesus Girls: True Tales of Growing Up Female and Evangelical, edited by Hannah Faith Notess, 2009

Awards and nominations
 Story of a Girl - 2007 National Book Award finalist; 2008 American Library Association Best Books for Young Adults
 Sweethearts - 2008 Cybil Award Finalist; 2009 American Library Association Best Books for Young Adults, Utah Book Award Finalist
 Story of a Girl (audiobook) - 2009 American Library Association Amazing Audiobooks for Young Adults 
 Once Was Lost - 2009 Utah Book Award Winner, INSPY Award Winner
 How to Save a Life - 2011 Utah Book Award Winner, Salt Lake City Weekly Arty Award Winner for Fiction
 Gem & Dixie - 2017 PEN Los Angeles Literary Prize Finalist

Personal life 
Zarr has spoken and written openly about growing up in an alcoholic family system and its influences on her writing. She was married in 1990; she and her husband have no children.

References

External links
 
 Little Brown author page
 HarperCollins author page
 

1970 births
Living people
American children's writers
American women novelists
American writers of young adult literature
20th-century American novelists
San Francisco State University alumni
Writers from San Francisco
Writers from Cleveland
Writers from Salt Lake City
American women children's writers
20th-century American women writers
Women writers of young adult literature
Novelists from Ohio
Novelists from Utah
21st-century American women